Elaine Crosby (born June 6, 1958) is an American professional golfer who played on the LPGA Tour.

Crosby won twice on the LPGA Tour in 1989 and 1994.

Crosby was elected to the University of Michigan Athletic Hall of Honor in 1996.

Crosby founded the website "FINDaLESSON.com".

Amateur wins
1980 Bowling Green Invitational Championship
1981 Michigan Womens Amateur Championship
Source:

Professional wins (4)

LPGA Tour wins (2)

Futures Tour wins (1)
1984 Bacon Park Charity Classic

Legends Tour wins (1)
2004 HyVee Classic

References

External links

American female golfers
Michigan Wolverines women's golfers
LPGA Tour golfers
Golfers from Michigan
People from Birmingham, Michigan
Sportspeople from Jackson, Michigan
1958 births
Living people